Utriculofera aplaga is a moth in the subfamily Arctiinae. It was described by George Hampson in 1900. It is found on New Guinea and on Rossel Island in the Louisiade Archipelago.

References

Moths described in 1900
Lithosiini